The 1994 Montana State Bobcats football team was an American football team that represented Montana State University in the Big Sky Conference (Big Sky) during the 1994 NCAA Division I-AA football season. In their third season under head coach Cliff Hysell, the Bobcats compiled a 3–8 record (0–7 against Big Sky opponents) and finished last in the Big Sky.

Schedule

References

Montana State
Montana State Bobcats football seasons
Montana State Bobcats football